Prosopis flexuosa, commonly known as tortuous mesquite and a variety of Spanish vernacular names including algarrobo dulce and algarrobo negro, is a species of flowering tree in the genus Prosopis of the family Fabaceae. It is found in arid and semi-arid regions of Argentina, Bolivia and Chile, including the western Gran Chaco and the Monte Desert, where it is a conspicuous and characteristic plant of the region. Its timber is used for construction, charcoal and fuel and its fruits are eaten by humans and livestock.

Description
Prosopis flexuosa has several varieties exhibiting different growth forms, appearing either as trees (arboreal form) or shrubs. It has a short trunk and long branches which often grow horizontally and turn up at the ends. They are somewhat leathery and are pinnate with nine to seventeen pairs of leaflets.

They are followed by long yellow pods with purplish blotches, which have twisted margins and contain a variable number of seeds. The sugar content of the seeds varies with the soil conditions and the area in which the tree is grown but the seeds are usually sweet, though sometimes bitter.

Distribution and habitat
Prosopis flexuosa is endemic to arid regions of South America. Its range includes western Argentina, northern Chile and possibly the southern part of Bolivia. It has two types of habitat, lowland dry forests and gallery forests. The tree is tolerant of drought, cold, salt and sand and is the hardiest species in its genus. It is extremely efficient with water consumption, producing most of its fruits in drought years, and has been successfully introduced into other arid regions.

Ecology
The rainy season normally starts in November and new foliage appears in early spring, irrespective of the actual arrival of the rains. The leaves may not be shed at all in mild winters. In more humid areas, the predominant species is the white quebracho (Aspidosperma quebracho-blanco), followed by P. flexuosa, chaparral (Larrea divaricata), Mimozyganthus carinatus and Acacia furcatispina. Under more arid conditions, P. flexuosa may predominate in open woodland with the Chilean greenwood (Geoffroea decorticans) and an understorey of caperbush (Capparis atamisquea), saltbush (Atriplex lampa) and seablite (Suaeda divaricata) also being present. The flowers produce large quantities of pollen and nectar and are beloved by bees, which also pollinate them.

Uses
The wood is dense and hard to nail. It is used for livestock fencing and the poles for vineyards, for joinery, for the production of charcoal and for firewood. The fruits have a high nutritional content and are eaten by local people and fed to livestock. This tree is favoured by beekeepers for the production of honey.

References

flexuosa
Trees of Argentina
Trees of Bolivia
Trees of Chile
Plants described in 1825
Taxa named by Augustin Pyramus de Candolle